Double Island or Wong Wan Chau is an island located in the north-eastern part of Hong Kong. Administratively, it is part of North District.

Geography
Double Island has an area of 2.13 km². It is the second largest island in North District, the largest being Crooked Island. Its highest point is at 139 m. Its western coast is facing Double Haven.

Wong Wan is a bay of Double Island. It is one of the 26 designated marine fish culture zones in Hong Kong.

Conservation
Double Island became part of the Plover Cove (Extension) Country Park in 1979.

Facilities
 Outward Bound Hong Kong Adventure Base

History

Typhoon of 1858
It is wrongly suggested that it was the Double Island in Hong Kong's Double Haven (Yan Chau Tong) where the September Typhoon of 1858 destroyed several well-known opium clippers, including the Anonyma, Gazelle, Pantaloon, and Mazeppa. Basil Lubbock's The Opium Clippers, cited in the original entry, is quite clear (p.347) that the Double Island in question was that at what was then called Swatow (today Shantou). The island is one of two that lie in the entrance to the river at Shantou and is the inner one, then called Masu. Today it is called Mayu. For corroboration see Mayers & Dennys, for the identity of Double Island. For the typhoon and the damage to the vessels, The Courier (Hobart, Tasmania), 22 December 1858, p.3 for a report of Mr Midwood, of the Commissariat service, resident on Double Island during the typhoon.

See also

 Mirs Bay

References

Islands of Hong Kong
North District, Hong Kong
Hong Kong UNESCO Global Geopark
Outward Bound
Underwater diving sites in Hong Kong
Uninhabited islands of Hong Kong